Charles E. Hanger (February 23, 1924 – July 23, 1995) was an American basketball player, known for his career as a collegian at the University of California, Berkeley (Cal) and as an All-American player in the Amateur Athletic Union (AAU) in the late 1940s and early 1950s.

Hanger attended Berkeley High School in Berkeley, California before moving to hometown Cal. After playing his first two seasons at Cal, Hanger enlisted in the United States Army in 1943 to fight in World War II. While in combat in Belgium, Hanger was captured on December 19, 1944, and held until released by American forces in April 1945. Following his service, Hanger returned to the Bears' lineup for the 1946–47 and 1947–48 seasons. As a senior, he was honored as an All-Pacific Coast Conference selection alongside teammate Andy Wolfe.

Following the close of his college career, Hanger was drafted by the Minneapolis Lakers in the 1948 BAA draft. However, he decided to instead play closer to home in the AAU, which was a common route for players of his generation. The 6'6" forward played for the Oakland Bittners and Oakland Blue n' Gold Atlas for four seasons. He won an AAU championship alongside Hall of Fame player Don Barksdale with the Bittners in 1949 and was twice named an AAU All-American (in 1949 and 1950).

After leaving basketball, Hanger was an attorney in the Bay Area for over 30 years. He died on July 23, 1995.

References

External links
Cal Golden Bears HOF bio

1924 births
1995 deaths
Amateur Athletic Union men's basketball players
American men's basketball players
American prisoners of war in World War II
Basketball players from Berkeley, California
Berkeley High School (Berkeley, California) alumni
California Golden Bears men's basketball players
California Golden Bears men's track and field athletes
California lawyers
Forwards (basketball)
Minneapolis Lakers draft picks
Sportspeople from Berkeley, California
20th-century American lawyers
United States Army personnel of World War II
World War II prisoners of war held by Germany